Santa Giulia is Roman Catholic church in Lucca, region of Tuscany, Italy.

History
The church is documented since as early as the 10th century, but it is more ancient, as testified by the Lombard tombs in the interior. It was rebuilt in the 13th century in brickwork, while the façade was completed  in the mid-14th century by Coluccio di Collo.

The use of blind arcades in the façade is a transitional element from Romanesque to Gothic architecture. The upper part of the façade dates to a later period.

The interior was modified several times. The current high altar was added in 1647 by commission of the Bernardini family, to house an ancient and venerated image of the Crucifixion. The church once housed a 12th-century Cross, now in the Cathedral of Lucca.

Sources

External links
Page at toscana.it 

13th-century Roman Catholic church buildings in Italy
Giulia
Romanesque architecture in Lucca